Bear Springs Creek is a stream located in the U.S. state of California. It is located in Tuolumne County.

References

Rivers of Northern California
Rivers of Tuolumne County, California